William Shannon Morris is an American politician. He is a Republican member of the Delaware House of Representatives, representing District 30. In 2018, Morris was elected after winning the general election against Democratic nominee Charles Groce.

References

External links
Official page at the Delaware General Assembly
Campaign site
 

Living people
Democratic Party members of the Delaware House of Representatives
21st-century American politicians
Year of birth missing (living people)